Louis Simon may refer to:

 Louis A. Simon (1867–1958), American architect
 Louis Simon (comedian), vaudeville comedian